Nebria macrogona is a species of ground beetle in the Nebriinae subfamily that is endemic to Japan.

References

macrogona
Beetles described in 1873
Beetles of Asia
Endemic fauna of Japan